The Grand Budapest Hotel: Original Soundtrack is the accompanying soundtrack album for the comedy-drama film of the same name, released on March 4, 2014 through ABKCO Records. Alexandre Desplat composed the soundtrack in his third collaboration with Wes Anderson. It is a Russian folk-influenced piece encompassing symphonic compositions and ambient drones, and features contributions from professional orchestras such as the Osipov State Russian Folk Orchestra and a 50-man orchestra of French and Russian balalaika players. His work on the soundtrack won Mr. Desplat an Oscar for Best Original Score at the 87th Academy Awards.

Track listing

References

External links

2014 soundtrack albums
Alexandre Desplat soundtracks
Comedy film soundtracks
Scores that won the Best Original Score Academy Award